Wilsthorpe is a hamlet in the East Riding of Yorkshire, England. It forms part of the civil parish of Carnaby.

In 2009 the East Riding of Yorkshire Council constructed a new 150 place secure boat compound at Wilsthorpe to replace an existing facility at South Shore, Bridlington. This is a first step in creating an integrated transport facility for Bridlington. As part of the first phase access to the hamlet was improved by the addition of a roundabout on the A165 (now A1038) which also provided access to a new park and ride facility on South Shore adjacent to the hamlet.

References

External links

Villages in the East Riding of Yorkshire
Populated coastal places in the East Riding of Yorkshire